The Saint Louis Crisis Nursery prevents child abuse and neglect by providing a safe place for children, birth through age 12, whose parents are experiencing overwhelming stress or in crisis. Saint Louis Crisis Nursery’s life-saving resources are critical to saving babies’ lives, keeping kids safe, and building strong families. Since its establishment in 1986, the Crisis Nursery has cared for more than 120,000 children.

Families voluntarily bring their children to one of the five Crisis Nursery sites in the greater St. Louis metropolitan region, for a variety of reasons, including:

 Overwhelming parental stress
 Parental or sibling illness or death
 Lack of utilities, food or shelter
 Domestic violence
 Other emergency situations that jeopardize the safety and well-being of the child, and that necessitate temporary parent-child separation.

Saint Louis Crisis Nursery is proactive in helping families overcome obstacles to maintaining family stability. Ninety-nine percent of children whose families participate in Crisis Nursery services remain in their natural family homes after their visit. Programs developed in response to family needs include the Parent Support Groups, Home Visits, Teen Parenting Groups, Art & Play Therapy Program, Holiday Hearts Campaign, Training Institute, School Supply Drive, Community Outreach and Family Emergency Fund.

History 
Since 1986, the Saint Louis Crisis Nursery has been a cornerstone in the fight against child abuse and neglect in the St. Louis region and a model for crisis nurseries around the country. The concept for Saint Louis Crisis Nursery began in 1983 when the Junior League of Saint Louis (JLSL) instituted a research committee on child abuse and focused on three prevalent needs—networking, education and crisis intervention services.

In 1985, the JLSL secured Deaconess Hospital (now Forest Park Hospital) as the site for the first Crisis Nursery. A United Way Research and Development Grant and a JLSL Grant were among the first sources of funds. The Coalition of 100 Black Women joined the collaborative effort in February 1986, providing educational resources to assist in structuring programs for children, training staff, participating on the Saint Louis Crisis Nursery's Board of Directors and developing a referral system.

Saint Louis Crisis Nursery welcomed its first child on July 21, 1986. In 1992, the agency opened Saint Louis Crisis Nursery North at Metropolitan Medical Center North in North St. Louis County (later relocated to Christian Hospital in 1994). Also in 1992, Crisis Nursery Saint Charles opened in a house owned by and adjacent to Saint Joseph Health Center in Saint Charles. A fourth Crisis Nursery in St. Charles opened in 1996 in partnership with the Community & Children's Resource Board of St. Charles County.

Also in 2006, Crisis Nursery opened two Outreach Centers - one in St. Charles County and one in St. Louis City. The fifth Crisis Nursery opened in Wentzville, Missouri, in 2008. Built from the ground up and maintained through funding and assistance from the CCRB, TR Hughes and SSM-St. Joseph’s Wentzville, the Wentzville location services children and families from St. Charles and Lincoln Counties in Missouri.

In 2010, for the first time ever, the Crisis Nursery was able to purchase a building to house one of its nurseries and child abuse prevention programs. Thanks to a generous gift of $500,000 from the Centene Charitable Foundation, the Saint Louis Crisis Nursery Centene Center opened in South St. Louis City, replacing the organization's original location at Forest Park Hospital School of Nursing, which was closing its doors. Emerson also has pledged $200,000 over five years for building renovation and maintenance at the new location.

The three-story facility serves 2,500 children a year, 500 more than the previous location, with separate spaces for babies and older children. An entire floor of the building is devoted to programs that address the needs of parents, delivered by Crisis Nursery’s therapeutic team of Family Empowerment professionals.
 
Saint Louis Crisis Nursery also responds to special needs in the community. During the Great Flood of 1993, the Nursery opened a temporary expansion site in Saint Charles, Missouri, to respond to families affected by the flood. This site served families who needed time to evacuate, apply for assistance and deal with the lengthy clean-up process. April 2011, Nursery staff were once again mobilized to help families impacted by the colossal Good Friday storms that devastated much of the St. Louis region.

Media coverage 
"Conversation with DiAnne Mueller, Saint Louis Crisis Nursery," Lee Presser, 2013
"Nonprofit Spotlight: Crisis Nursery," Ladue News, August 2013
"Making the Most of a Furlough," ABC World News with Charles Gibson, March 12, 2009
"New Crisis Nursery Opens," Suburban Journals, June 22, 2010
"Child Abuse: Despite High Profile Cases, The Numbers Aren't Changing Much," KTVI-TV, May 2010
"Corporation gives $500,000 for new Crisis Nursery building," Suburban Journals, April 20, 2010
"Emerson donates $40K for Crisis Nursery facility," St. Louis American, May 12, 2010
"Crisis Nursery offers child safety tips for summer," Suburban Journals, June 8, 2010
"Against the Odds, St. Louis Crisis Nursery Continues to Grow," Child Advocacy 360, March 10, 2010

See also 
Child abuse
Child advocacy
Child advocacy 360
Family therapy

References 
 The Community and Children's Resource
 United Way of Greater St. Louis
 Children's Trust Fund
 Developmental Disabilities Resource Board
 Productive Living Board
 Variety: The Children's Charity

Organizations based in St. Louis